This article is a list of statistics and records relating to Oldham Athletic Football Club.  Oldham Athletic are an English football club based on Oldham.  The club was founded in 1895 as Pine Villa Football Club before renaming in 1899.  The club joined the Football League in 1907 though did not win a league title until 1952. Oldham Athletic currently play in Football League two, the third tier of English football.  The club plays their home games at Boundary Park, having moved from Sheepfoot Lane in 1905.

This list encompasses all honours won by Oldham Athletic and any club records, by their managers and players.

All statistics are correct as of the end of Oldham Athletic's 2016-17 season.

Honours

League
Football League Second Division: (1)
1990–91
Football League Third Division: (1)
1973–74
Football League Third Division North: (1)
1952–53
Ford Sporting League: (1)
1970–71

Cup
Lancashire Senior Cup: (3)
1907–08, 1966–67, 2005–06

Managerial records

First manager: David Ashworth
Longest serving manager by time: Jimmy Frizzell – 12 years, 102 days between 1970 and 1982
Longest serving manager by games: Joe Royle – 602 competitive games as manager
Most victories: 225 victories by Joe Royle, 1982–1994

Players

League Appearances
525, Ian Wood between 1966 and 1980

Goals
Season: 33, Tom Davis, Second Division, 1936–37
League Career: 141, Roger Palmer, between 1980 and 1994
Overall Career: 156, Roger Palmer, between 1980 and 1994

International Caps
25, Gunnar Halle for Norway, between 1991 and 1996

Transfer fees
Received: £1,700,000 for Earl Barrett, Aston Villa (February 1992)
Paid: £750,000 for Ian Olney, Aston Villa (June 1992)

Club records

Victories
Record win: 11–0 v Southport, Fourth Division, 26 December 1962
Record league win: 11–0 v Southport, Fourth Division, 26 December 1962
Record FA Cup win: 10–1 v Lytham, first round, 28 November 1925
Record League Cup win: 7–0 v Scarborough, 25 October 1989

Losses
Record league loss: 9
0–9 v Hull City, Third Division North, 5 April 1958
4–13 v Tranmere Rovers, Third Division North, 26 December 1935

Attendance
47,671 v Sheffield Wednesday, FA Cup Fourth Round, 25 January 1930

League Attendance
45,120 v Blackpool, Second Division, 21 April 1930

Gate receipts
£138,680 v Manchester United, Premier League, 29 December 1993

Points
Most points in a season:
Two points for a win: 61 in 42 matches, Third Division, 1973–74
Three points for a win: 88 in 46 matches, Second Division, 1990–91

Streaks
Longest winning run: 10 (12 January 1974 – 16 March 1974)
Longest losing run: 6 (5 February 2005 – 26 February 2005)
Longest unbeaten run: 17 (25 August 1990 – 10 November 1990)
Longest run without a win: 17 (9 September 1920 – 25 December 1920)

Season-by-season performances

External links
Facts from OldhamAthletic.co.uk
Oldham Athletic all time records from Soccerbase

Oldham Athletic
Records And Statistics